Vetiș is a commune of 4,475 inhabitants situated in Satu Mare County, Romania. It is composed of three villages: Decebal (Újtelep), Oar (Óvári) and Vetiș.

Demographics
Ethnic groups (2002 census): 
Romanians: 48.78%
Hungarians: 45.87%
Romanies (Gypsies): 2.59%

According to mother tongue, 59.10% of the population speak Hungarian, while 39.55% speak Romanian as their first language.

References

Communes in Satu Mare County